Lalla Khedidja or (Kabylian: Tamgut Aâlayen or Azeru Amghur), is a mountain in Algeria. At , it is the highest summit of the Djurdjura Range, a subrange of the Tell Atlas.

Geography
This peak is located in the Akouker subrange of the eastern part of the Djurjura Range. It is also the highest point of the Tell Atlas itself, which is in turn part of the wider Atlas Mountain System. The Lalla Khedidja is usually covered in snow in the winter.

See also
 List of mountains in Algeria
 List of Ultras of Africa

References

External links

 "Lalla Khedidja, Algeria" on Peakbagger
Grande Kabylie

Panoramic view

Lalla Khedidja
Atlas Mountains